Peter Mark Giles (born April 18, 1970) is a Canadian sprint kayaker who competed in the mid-1990s. He finished seventh in the K-4 1000 m event at the 1996 Summer Olympics in Atlanta. His brother, Stephen Giles, is also an Olympic canoeist.

References
Sports-Reference.com profile

1970 births
Canadian male canoeists
Canoeists at the 1996 Summer Olympics
Living people
Olympic canoeists of Canada
Pan American Games medalists in canoeing
Pan American Games bronze medalists for Canada
Sportspeople from London, Ontario
Canoeists at the 1991 Pan American Games
Medalists at the 1991 Pan American Games
20th-century Canadian people